Paisano may refer to:

Places in the United States

Arizona
 Casa Juan Paisano, a historic house in Tucson

Texas
 Paisano Grant, one of twenty-five land grants made in the Brooks County/Jim Wells County area
 Paisano Park, Texas, a census-designated place in San Patricio County
 El Paisano Hotel, a historic hotel in Marfa
 El Paisano Ranch, a ranch in Jim Wells County
 Edgewater-Paisano, Texas, a suburb of Mathis

Other uses
 The Paisano, an independent student-run newspaper of the University of Texas at San Antonio
 Edna Paisano (1948–2014), Nez Perce and Laguna Pueblo demographer and statistician
 Sphodros paisano, a species of purseweb spider in the family Atypidae
 Ue... paisano!, a 1953 Argentine film

See also
 Paisan'', a 1946 Italian neorealist war drama film